A free-ranging dog is a dog that is not confined to a yard or house. Free-ranging dogs include street dogs, village dogs, stray dogs, feral dogs, etc., and may be owned or unowned. The global dog population is estimated to be 900 million, of which around 20% are regarded as owned pets and therefore restrained.

Origin
Dogs living with humans is a dynamic relationship, with a large proportion of the dog population losing contact with humans at some stage over time. This loss of contact first occurred after domestication and has reoccurred throughout history.

The global dog population is estimated to be 900 million and rising. Although it is said that the "dog is man's best friend" for the 17–24% of dogs that live as pets in the developed countries, in the developing world pet dogs are uncommon but there are many village, community or feral dogs. Most of these dogs live out their lives as scavengers and have never been owned by humans, with one study showing their most common response when approached by strangers is to run away (52%) or respond aggressively (11%). Little is known about these dogs, or the dogs in developed countries that are feral, stray or that are in shelters, as the majority of modern research on dog cognition has focused on pet dogs living in human homes.

Categories of dogs 
There is confusion with the terms used to categorize dogs. Dogs can be classed by whether they possess an owner or a community of owners, how freely they can move around, and any genetic differences they have from other dog populations due to long-term separation.

Owned dogs 
Owned dogs are "family" dogs. They have an identifiable owner, are commonly socialized, and are not allowed to roam. They are restricted to particular outdoor or indoor areas. They have little impact on wildlife unless going with humans into natural areas.

Free-ranging owned dogs 
A free-ranging dog is a dog that is not confined to a yard or house. Free-ranging owned dogs are cared for by one owner or a community of owners, and are able to roam freely. This includes "village dogs", which live in rural areas and human habitations. These are not confined. However, they rarely leave the village vicinity. This also includes "rural free-ranging dogs", which also live in rural areas and human habitations. These are owned or are associated with homes, and they are not confined. These include farm and pastoral dogs that range over particular areas.

Free-ranging unowned dogs 

Free-ranging unowned dogs are stray dogs. They get their food and shelter from human environments, but they have not been socialized and so they avoid humans as much as possible. Free-ranging unowned dogs include "urban free-ranging dogs", which live in cities and urban areas. These have no owner but are commensals, subsisting on left over food from human, garbage or other dogs' food as their primary food sources. Free-ranging unowned dogs also include feral dogs.

Feral dogs 

The term "feral" can be used to describe those animals that have been through the process of domestication but have returned to a wild state. "Domesticated" and "socialized" (tamed) do not mean the same thing, as it is possible for an individual animal of a domesticated species to be feral and not tame, and it is possible for an individual animal of a wild species to be socialized to live with humans.

Feral dogs differ from other dogs because they did not have close human contact early in their lives (socialization). Feral dogs live in a wild state with no food and shelter intentionally provided by humans and show a continuous and strong avoidance of direct human contact. The distinction between feral, stray, and free-ranging dogs is sometimes a matter of degree, and a dog may shift its status throughout its life. In some unlikely but observed cases, a feral dog that was not born wild but lived with a feral group can become rehabilitated to a domestic dog with an owner. A dog can become a stray when it escapes human control, by abandonment or being born to a stray mother. A stray dog can become feral when it is forced out of the human environment or when it is co-opted or socially accepted by a nearby feral group. Feralization occurs by the development of a fear response to humans. Feral dogs are not reproductively self-sustaining, suffer from high rates of juvenile mortality, and depend indirectly on humans for their food, their space, and the supply of co-optable individuals.

"Wild" dogs 

The existence of "wild dogs" is debated. Some authors propose that this term applies to the Australian dingo and dingo-feral dog hybrids. They believe that these have a history of independence from humans and should no longer be considered as domesticated. Others disagree, and propose that the dingo was once domesticated and is now a feral dog.

The first British colonists to arrive in Australia established a settlement at Port Jackson in 1788 and recorded dingoes living there with indigenous Australians. Although the dingo exists in the wild, it associates with humans but has not been selectively bred as have other domesticated animals. The dingo's relationship with indigenous Australians can be described as commensalism, in which two organisms live in close association but without depending on each other for survival. They will both hunt and sleep together. The dingo is therefore comfortable enough around humans to associate with them, but is still capable of living independently, much like the domestic cat. Any free-ranging unowned dog can be socialized to become an owned dog, as some dingoes do when they join human families.

Another point of view regards domestication as a process that is difficult to define. It regards dogs as being either socialized and able to exist with humans, or unsocialized. There exist dogs that live with their human families but are unsocialized and will treat strangers aggressively and defensively as might a wild wolf. There also exists a number of cases where wild wolves have approached people in remote places, attempting to get them to play and to form companionship.

Rabies impact
In 2011, a media article on the stray dog population by the US National Animal Interest Alliance said that there are 200 million stray dogs worldwide and that a "rabies epidemic" was causing a global public health issue. In 2013, the World Health Organization reports that dogs are responsible for the vast majority of human rabies deaths, contributing up to 99% of all rabies transmissions to humans. Rabies causes tens of thousands of deaths every year, mainly in Asia and Africa. More than 15 million people receive post-bite rabies vaccines to prevent the disease.

Conservation impact
Increasing numbers of free-ranging dogs have become a threat to the snow leopard and young brown bears on the Tibetan Plateau because dog packs chase these animals away from food. Free-ranging dogs are often vectors of diseases such as rabies and canine distemper, which can jump into species such as African wild dogs, wolves, lions and tigers. In addition, they can interbreed with other members of the genus Canis such as the Ethiopian wolf and the dingo, raising genetic purity concerns.

See also
 Dogs portal
Feral cat
Dog
Puppy

References

Bibliography 
 Beck, Alan M., "The Ecology of Stray Dogs: A Study of Free-Ranging Urban Animals" (1973). Purdue University Press Books.

Feral dogs
Urban wildlife